Kenneth George Wilson (Akron, Ohio, 21 April 1923 – Mansfield, Connecticut, 11 March 2003) was an author, professor of English and vice president at the University of Connecticut. His best-known work is The Columbia Guide to Standard American English, published in 1993.

Through the 1970s Wilson served as UConn's vice president for academic programs or academic affairs. With the 1974 change in title, the vice presidency replaced the provost as the university's chief academic office. He had been dean of the university's College of Liberal Arts and Sciences from 1966 to 1970 and head of the English department in 1965-66. 

"Many of his contemporaries credit Wilson with starting the process of making UConn a nationally respected university," a university press release  and the university magazine, Advance, said at the time of his death in 2003. 

Wilson returned to teaching in 1981 and retired in 1989. He had joined UConn's Storrs campus faculty in 1951 as an instructor and rose to be a full professor. A graduate of Albion College in Albion, Mich., Wilson earned his master's and doctoral degrees from the University of Michigan. He was a native of Akron, Ohio.

He is the subject of an article in Contemporary Authors (December 2007) by Thomson Gale.

When the Columbia Guide was published online by Bartleby.com in 2001, the site said of Wilson's book: "A vigorous assessment of how our language is best written and spoken and how we can use it most effectively, this guide is the ideal handbook of language etiquette: friendly, sensible, reliable, and fun to read."

The electronic edition continues to be offered through licenses to libraries and other institutions. 

The Guide has 6,500 entries, including both descriptive and prescriptive examples. The electronic edition features 4,300 hyperlinked cross-references.

In the book's introduction, Wilson called standard American English usage "linguistic good manners, sensitively and accurately matched to context — to listeners or readers, to situation, and to purpose."

Bibliography
 Essays on Language and Usage (1962) with Leonard Fellows Dean
 Harbrace guide to dictionaries (1963)
 The Play of Language: A Revision of Essays on Language and Usage (January 1971, September 1971) with Leonard Fellows Dean, and W. Walker Gibson
 Van Winkle's Return: Change in American English, 1966-1986 (June 1987)
 The Columbia Guide to Standard American English (1993, May 1999), from 2001 to June 2009 available free of charge online at Bartleby.com

As Editor
 Models in Plant Physiology and Biochemistry by David W. Newman, Ph.D. (October 1987)

References

1923 births
2003 deaths
Albion College alumni
Linguistics writers
Writers from Akron, Ohio
University of Michigan alumni
University of Connecticut people